Dinosaur Annex Music Ensemble is a contemporary chamber music ensemble based in Boston, Massachusetts. The group was founded in 1975 by composers Scott Wheeler, Rodney Lister, and Ezra Sims as the concert giving “annex” of New England Dinosaur Dance Theater. The ensemble has been independently incorporated since 1977.

The ensemble is currently directed by Co-Artistic Directors Hubert Ho and Felicia Chen. Recent directors include Sue-Ellen Hershman-Tcherepnin, Yu-Hui Chang, Emily Koh, and Scott Wheeler. Current members include Donald Berman, piano; Gabriela Diaz, violin; Anne Black, viola/violin; Rafael Popper-Keizer, cello; Diane Heffner, clarinets/sax; Sue-Ellen Hershman-Tcherepnin, flute; Katherine V. Matasy, clarinets/sax/accordion; and Robert Schulz, percussion. The group's core musicians perform regularly with the Boston Symphony, Boston Pops, Boston Lyric Opera, Boston Ballet, Handel and Haydn, Pro Arte Chamber Orchestra, and in Boston's Broadway theater productions. Notable guest performers and conductors include Gunther Schuller, Lorraine Hunt, John Harbison, D'Anna Fortunato, Pamela Dellal, and Pascal Verrot.

Dinosaur Annex Music Ensemble has commissioned works by a number of composers since the group's establishment in 1975, including Mark Berger, Martin Boykan, Dana Brayton, Jeffery Brooks, Richard Busch, Robert Ceely, Shih-Hui Chen, Tamar Deisendruck, Tom Flaherty, Lee Hyla, David Lang, Arthur Levering, Ruth Lomon, Lansing McLoskey, John McDonald, Malcolm Peyton, David Rakowski, Laurie San Martin, James Russel Smith, Kurt Stallmann, Lewis Spratlan, Peter Van Zandt Lane, Donald Wheelock, and Evan Ziporyn.

Discography 
 Peter Homans, A Prague Spring, 2007 (MMC)
 Donald Martino, Quintino, 2007 (Navona)
 Martin Boykan, Piano Trio no. 2, 1999 (CRI)
 Martin Boykan, Flume, 2002 (CRI)
 Lee Hyla, String Trio, 1983 (CRI)
 Ian Krouse, Tientos, 1997 (Koch International)
 Arthur Levering, Still Raining, Still Dreaming, 2005 (New World)
 Arthur Levering, School of Velocity, 1994 (CRI)
 Scott Lindroth, Human Gestures, 1998 (CRI)
 David Liptak, Ancient Songs, 2004 (Bridge)
 Malcolm Peyton, Songs from T. Sturge Moore (Centuar)
 Ezra Sims, Come Away, 1986 (CRI)
 Ezra Sims, Quintet for Clarinet and Strings, 1991 (CRI)
 Robert Sirota, Seven Pocassos, 1988 (Capstone)
 Dinosaur Annex: Thirty Years of Adventure, 1975–2005

References

External links 
 Dinosaur Annex official site
 New Music Connoisseur review: Metaphysics and Magic
 New Music Connoisseur review: Sleeping, Waking, Dreaming
 Boston Globe, May 5, 1999: Dinosaur Annex Delivers Savvy Premiere
 Boston Musical Intelligencer, January 24, 2011: Dinosaur Annex, Encouraging Youth in Music

Musical groups established in 1975
Musical groups from Boston
Chamber music groups